"Cai Weiweng" is a short story by Pu Songling first published in Strange Tales from a Chinese Studio. Set at the end of the Ming dynasty, the story follows the enigmatic title character who assists an army commander in training his troops.

Plot
While preparing to cross the south end of the Yangtze, Yuling native and army commander Liu Zhisheng encounters a lightly-dressed man whose belly is exposed. The stranger introduces himself as Cai Weiweng and offers to train Liu's troops. Cai also demonstrates his ability to slot an inordinate amount of weapons into his navel. By-and-by, mysterious deaths befall men whose actions are disagreeable to Cai; the troops tire of Cai's disciplinarian ways and petition for his removal. Liu approves of Cai's assassination; the soldiers attempt to behead him while he is asleep, but Cai's head immediately reattaches to his body. Next, they slice open his belly, only to be met with an onslaught of halberds and arrows. Upon being notified of this, Liu rushes into Cai's tent but he is nowhere to be found.

Publication history
Originally titled "Cai Weiweng", the story was first published in Pu Songling's anthology of close to five hundred short stories, Strange Tales from a Chinese Studio or Liaozhai Zhiyi. It was translated into English by Sidney L. Sondergard and included in the fourth volume of Strange Tales from Liaozhai published in 2010.

Themes and analysis
Several commentators have argued that the story promotes anti-Qing sentiment. Zhu Jidun writes that the titular character symbolises the Southern Ming dynasty. Comparing it with other Strange Tales entries like "Household Monsters" and "General She", Wang Xiaojia remarks that Pu adopts a particularly wistful attitude towards the collapse of the Ming dynasty in "Cai Weiweng". The story also alludes to the gathering of over ten thousand rebels by Changshan Ming loyalist Liu Konghe in support of the Hongguang Emperor.

References

Citations

Bibliography

 
 
 
 

Stories within Strange Tales from a Chinese Studio